Joaquín Sáenz y Arriaga (12 October 1899 – 28 April 1976) was a Mexican Catholic priest and  theologian.  Jesuit from 1916 to 1952 he was later a harsh critic of the Second Vatican Council decisions and of the post-conciliar Pope Paul VI. In 1972, he was declared excommunicated by the Roman Catholic bishops' conference of Mexico. He is considered to be one of the first promoters of sedevacantism.

Biography

Joaquín Sáenz y Arriaga was born on 12 October 1899 in Mexico.

As a young man, he was brought up in the spirit of the Cristero movement, Miguel Pro, and other Catholics who fought against the government of Mexico in the 1920s. Sáenz placed great emphasis on the Catholic doctrine of the Kingship of Christ.

Traditionalism and sedevacantism

When the reforms of the Second Vatican Council began to be implemented in Mexico and North America, it was Sáenz who led the fight against them. His uncompromising traditionalism led to a rejection of the new Conciliar Church, and he was among the first to propound the theological conclusion of sedevacantism, which maintains that, since the death of Pope Pius XII, there has been a state of sede vacante in Rome because the following so-called popes espoused the heretical teachings of the sham Second Vatican Council.

He later incorporated these ideas in his books La nueva iglesia montiniana (The new Montinian Church) (1971), and Sede Vacante: Paulo VI no es Papa legítimo (Sede Vacante: Paul VI is not a legitimate Pope) (1973). In these books, he stated that Paul VI had forfeited his papal authority through public, pertinacious and manifest heresy, a position which he had reportedly held for some time.  He was a catalyzing influence on lay and clerical Catholic traditionalists who opposed the Second Vatican Council in Mexico and North America, persuading them to defend and maintain the "True Faith", and setting up independent chapels and churches.

Excommunication

In reaction to his activities, the Mexican Cardinal Miguel Darío Miranda y Gómez officially declared that Sáenz had incurred excommunication.

In response, Father Moisés Carmona, Sáenz' associate and disciple wrote:

Unión Católica Trento

In the 1970s, Sáenz, together with Carmona and Father Adolfo Zamora, founded the Unión Católica Trento (Tridentine Catholic Union), during which time he also advised American Catholic traditionalists to form their own organizations, which resulted in Father Francis E. Fenton's founding of the Orthodox Roman Catholic Movement, the American parallel of the Unión Católica Trento.

Death

In his last testament, written on 25 April 1976, Sáenz wrote:

and he added:

He died of prostate cancer, three days after, on 28 April 1976.

Notes

References

1899 births
1976 deaths
Anti-Protestantism
Sedevacantists
Former Jesuits
People excommunicated by the Catholic Church
Mexican anti-communists
Mexican Jesuits
Mexican traditionalist Catholics
Dissident Roman Catholic theologians
Deaths from prostate cancer
Deaths from cancer in Mexico
20th-century Mexican Roman Catholic priests